Josep Maria Subirachs i Sitjar (11 March 1927 – 7 April 2014) was a Spanish sculptor and painter of the late 20th century. His best known work is probably the Passion Facade of the basilica of the Sagrada Família in Barcelona. He was controversial, as he did not make any concessions to the style of the architect who designed the building, Antoni Gaudí.

Subirachs' sculptural typography in Barcelona is featured in Eye magazine (No. 37, Vol. 10, Autumn 2000) along with the work of Joan Brossa.

Artistic works

From a young age he showed talent as an integral artist: painter, engraver, scenic designer, sculptor, lecturer, art critic, always with the vocation of the architect who he had liked to be.

He worked in projects around the world, in different styles: Mediterranean style, Expressionism, Abstract art, new figuration.

Main works
1957: Forma 212. Sculpture in Jardins Mundet (Barcelona)
1960: Marine evocation ("Evocació marinera"). La Barceloneta (Barcelona).
1962: Saint Michael's cross. Santa Maria de Montserrat Abbey
1968: Monument to Mexico
1969: Façades of the new building for Barcelona Town Hall
1983: Olimp. Monument to the Olympic Games, in the CIO office, Lausanne (Switzerland)
1984: Monument to Pablo Casals, Vendrell
Since 1987: Passion Façade of the Sagrada Família in Barcelona
1988: Monument to Gaspar de Portolà, Pacifica, California
1989: Monument Unió d'Orient i Occident, Seoul (South Korea)
1991: Monument to President Macià in the Plaça Catalunya, Barcelona

Recognitions
Member of the Reial Acadèmia Catalana de Belles Arts de Sant Jordi, Barcelona
Corresponding Member of the Hispanic Society of America of New York
Creu de Sant Jordi of the Generalitat de Catalunya
Medal of the Universitat Autònoma de Barcelona
Officier dans l'Ordre des Arts et Lettres of France
Personnalité de l'Année 1987, Paris
Member of the Real Academia de Bellas Artes de San Fernando, Madrid
Medalla de Honor, Real Academia de Bellas Artes de Santa Isabel, Hungria

The asteroid 134124 Subirachs, discovered in 2005, was named in his honour.

External links
 Subirachs' website 
  «Mirades, reflexions sobre la vida i obra de l'artista, Josep Maria Subirachs i Sitjar» (audio). l'Arxiu de la Paraula. Ateneu Barcelonès, 2014.

Notes

Sculptors from Catalonia
1927 births
2014 deaths